Hans Magnusson (born 5 July 1960) is a Swedish speed skater. He competed at the 1984 Winter Olympics and the 1988 Winter Olympics.

References

External links
 

1960 births
Living people
Swedish male speed skaters
Olympic speed skaters of Sweden
Speed skaters at the 1984 Winter Olympics
Speed skaters at the 1988 Winter Olympics
People from Berg Municipality
Sportspeople from Jämtland County
20th-century Swedish people